Cyana basisticta is a moth of the family Erebidae. It was described by George Hampson in 1914. It is found in Ghana and Sierra Leone.

References

Cyana
Moths described in 1914
Moths of Africa
Insects of West Africa